Ambazari lake (Marathi : अंबाझरी तलाव) is situated near the Southwest border of Nagpur, in the state of  Maharashtra, India.  It is one of the 11 lakes in Nagpur and is the largest lake in the city.  The Nag River of Nagpur originates from this lake.  This was built in the year 1870, under Bhonsle rule, for supplying water to the city.  Government officials and eminent people were supplied water through clay pipes.  This lake is near VNIT and surrounded by mango trees, gaining the name Ambazari as "Amba" means "mango" in Marathi. 

The lake was used to supply water to Nagpur for over 30 years. The lake is beautiful and serene.

Garden
The lake also has a garden located just beside it known as Ambazari garden. The garden was established in 1958 on an area of 18 acres of land. This place is managed and preserved by the Nagpur Municipal Corporation. The musical fountain, various electric rides, and amusement games were once present in the garden but have been discontinued. The garden is frequented by walkers in the morning and, in the afternoon, it turns into couple spot. Radio speakers were added in the park, which plays soothing music and green gym. This is one of the famous tourist attractions of Nagpur.

References

Geography of Nagpur
Lakes of Maharashtra
Tourist attractions in Nagpur district